Ghadir Bridge is a bridge over the Zayanderud in Districts 4 and 6 of Isfahan. The bridge was completed in 2000.

Transportation
 Sayyad Shirazi Expressway
 Hemmat Expressway

See also
 Bridges over the Zayandeh River

References 

Bridges in Isfahan
Bridges completed in 2000
2000 establishments in Iran